James Barnes Wyngaarden (October 19, 1924 – June 14, 2019) was an American physician, researcher and academic administrator. He was a co-editor of Cecil Textbook of Medicine, one of the leading internal medicine texts, and served as director of National Institutes of Health between 1982 and 1989. He had four daughters and one son.

Wyngaarden was a member of the Royal Swedish Academy of Sciences.

References

External links
 James B. Wyngaarden Papers at Duke University Medical Center Archives
 National Institutes of Health death announcement

1924 births
2019 deaths
Writers from Grand Rapids, Michigan
Directors of the National Institutes of Health
Members of the United States National Academy of Sciences
Physicians from Michigan
Calvin University alumni
National Institutes of Health people
Members of the Royal Swedish Academy of Sciences
University of Michigan Medical School alumni
Reagan administration personnel
George H. W. Bush administration personnel
Members of the National Academy of Medicine